The 1993–94 Washington Huskies men's basketball team represented the University of Washington for the 1993–94 NCAA Division I men's basketball season. Led by first-year head coach Bob Bender, the Huskies were members of the Pacific-10 Conference and played their home games on campus at Hec Edmundson Pavilion in Seattle, Washington.

Although swept by Northwest rivals Oregon and Washington State, the Huskies' big win of the season was an upset of #12 Arizona, 
the Wildcats won the Pac-10 title and advanced to the Final Four. There was no conference tournament this season; last played in 1990, it resumed in 2002.

Bender was hired in April 1993; he was previously the head coach at

References

External links
Sports Reference – Washington Huskies: 1993–94 basketball season

Washington Huskies men's basketball seasons
Washington Huskies
Washington
Washington